Charles is a surname, and may refer to:

Art and entertainment

 Craig Charles, British actor and comedian
 Dave Charles, British drummer, recording engineer and record producer
 Don Charles (1933–2005), English ballad singer, record producer, and author
 Emily Hawthorne (born Emily Thornton Charles) (1845–1895), American poet, journalist, suffragist, newspaper founder
 Glen Charles, American screenwriter and television producer, working with his brother Les Charles
 Jeannette Charles, British actress, look-alike of Queen Elizabeth II
 Jennifer Charles, American singer
 Jos Charles, American poet
 Josh Charles, American actor
 Keith Charles (actor) (1934–2008), American theatre and television actor
 Larry Charles, American film director
 Les Charles, American screenwriter and television producer, working with his brother Glen Charles
 Billy Ocean (born Leslie Sebastian Charles), American singer
 Max Charles, American actor
 Nicola Charles, English actress
 Ray Charles, American pianist and musician
 Ray Charles, American composer and conductor of The Ray Charles Singers
 Ron Charles (critic), American book critic
 RuPaul Andre Charles, American drag queen and actor
 Sam Charles, American painter and pianist
 Tina Charles, English singer

Law and administration
 David Charles (public servant), Australian senior public servant and consultant
 P. S. M. Charles, Sri Lankan Tamil civil servant
 Sir William Charles, British judge

Politics
 Bob Charles (politician), Australian politician (Liberal Party)
 David Charles (born 1948), Australian politician (Labor Party)
 Eugenia Charles, Prime Minister of Dominica (1980-1995)
 George Charles, Chief minister of St. Lucia (1960-1964)
 Pierre Charles, Prime Minister of Dominica (2000-2004)

Religion
 David Charles (hymn-writer) (1762–1834), Welsh hymn-writer
 David Charles (minister) (1812–1878), Welsh Methodist cleric
 E. Otis Charles, retired bishop of the Episcopal Diocese of Utah
 Robert Charles (scholar), English biblical scholar
 Sydney Anicetus Charles (1929 - 2018), Trinidadian bishop
 Thomas Charles, Welsh Calvinistic Methodist clergyman

Science and academia
 David Charles (physician) (born 1964), neurologist
 David Charles (philosopher), professor of philosophy at the University of Oxford
 Enid Charles (1894–1972), statistician and demographer
 Jacques Charles (1746–1823), French scientist describing the behaviour of an ideal gas.
 Vera Charles (1877–1954) American mycologist

Sports
 Bob Charles (golfer), New Zealandian golf player
 David Atiba Charles (born 1977), football player
 Stephen Charles, English cricketer
 Cyrille Charles, Saint Lucian cricketer 
 Daedra Charles, American basketball player
 David Atiba Charles, Trinidadian football player
 Ed Charles, American baseball player
 Ezzard Charles, former world heavyweight boxing champion
 Gary Charles, British football player
 Jamaal Charles, American football player
 John Charles (English footballer), English football player
 John Charles (1931-2004), Welsh footballer
 Lorenzo Charles, American former college and professional basketball player
 Mel Charles, Welsh professional football player
 Ned Charles, Mauritian football player
 Ron Charles (basketball), American basketball player
 Rudy Charles, American professional wrestling referee
 Saahdiq Charles (born 1999), American football player
 Stefan Charles, American football player
 Tina Charles, American basketball player

Fictional characters
 Keith Charles (Six Feet Under), character on the American TV series Six Feet Under
 Nick and Nora Charles, characters created in Dashiell Hammett's novel The Thin Man
 Chuck Charles, character from the film The Penguins of Madagascar

See also
 Charles, for the first name

Surnames of Haitian origin
English-language surnames